The mixed doubles table tennis event at the 2018 Asian Games took place from 29 to 30 August 2018 at the Jakarta International Expo. Seeds were based on the individual ITTF World Ranking lists published in August 2018 with a maximum of 2 pairs per country.

Schedule
All times are Western Indonesia Time (UTC+07:00)

Results
Legend
r — Retired
WO — Won by walkover

Finals

Top half

Section 1

Section 2

Section 3

Section 4

Bottom half

Section 5

Section 6

Section 7

Section 8

References

External links
Table tennis at the 2018 Asian Games

Mixed doubles